Jesse Burr Strode (February 18, 1845 – November 10, 1924) was an American Republican Party politician.

He was born in Fulton County, Illinois on February 18, 1845, and graduated from Abingdon College in Abingdon, Illinois (which was later consolidated with Eureka College). During the American Civil War he enlisted in Company G, Fiftieth Regiment, of the Illinois Volunteer Infantry serving from September 10, 1861, to the end of the war.

He returned to Abingdon first becoming principal of the schools from 1865 to 1873, being elected councilman six times and mayor twice. He moved to Plattsmouth, Nebraska and studied law passing the bar in and set up practice there in 1879. He was a district attorney from 1882 to 1888, moving to Lincoln, Nebraska in 1887. He was a district court judge in 1892. He was elected to the Fifty-fourth United States Congress and reelected to the Fifty-fifth United States Congress as a representative for the 1st district of Nebraska. He did not run for reelection in 1898, returning to Nebraska to become prosecuting attorney for the third district of Nebraska. He then became department commander of the Grand Army of the Republic in 1919 and 1920. He died in Lincoln on November 10, 1924, and is buried in Wyuka Cemetery.

References
 
 
 
 

1845 births
1924 deaths
People from Fulton County, Illinois
People of Illinois in the American Civil War
Illinois city council members
Mayors of places in Illinois
Nebraska state court judges
Republican Party members of the United States House of Representatives from Nebraska
People from Plattsmouth, Nebraska
Grand Army of the Republic officials